Acetone peroxide ( also called APEX and mother of Satan) is an organic peroxide and a primary explosive. It is produced by the reaction of acetone and hydrogen peroxide to yield a mixture of linear monomer and cyclic dimer, trimer, and tetramer forms. The dimer is known as  diacetone diperoxide (DADP). The trimer is known as triacetone triperoxide (TATP) or tri-cyclic acetone peroxide (TCAP). Acetone peroxide takes the form of a white crystalline powder with a distinctive bleach-like odor (when impure) or a fruit-like smell when pure, and can explode powerfully if subjected to heat, friction, static electricity, concentrated sulfuric acid, strong UV radiation or shock. Until about 2015, explosives detectors were not set to detect non-nitrogenous explosives, as most explosives used preceding 2015 were nitrogen-based. TATP, being nitrogen-free, has been used as the explosive of choice in several terrorist bomb attacks since 2001.

History 
Acetone peroxide (specifically, triacetone triperoxide) was discovered in 1895 by the German chemist Richard Wolffenstein.

In 1899 Adolf von Baeyer and Victor Villiger described the first synthesis of the dimer and described use of acids for the synthesis of both peroxides.  
Baeyer and Villiger prepared the dimer by combining potassium persulfate in diethyl ether with acetone, under cooling. They found that the trimer could be prepared by adding hydrochloric acid to a chilled mixture of acetone and hydrogen peroxide. By using the depression of freezing points to determine the molecular weights of the compounds, they also determined that the form of acetone peroxide that they had prepared via potassium persulfate was a dimer, whereas the acetone peroxide that had been prepared via hydrochloric acid was a trimer, like Wolffenstein's compound.

Work on this methodology and on the various products obtained, was further investigated in the mid-20th century by Milas and Golubović.

Chemistry 

The chemical name, Acetone peroxide is most commonly used to refer to the cyclic trimer, the product of a reaction between two precursors, hydrogen peroxide and acetone, in an acid-catalyzed nucleophilic addition, although various further monomeric and dimeric forms are possible.

Specifically, two dimers, one cyclic (C6H12O4) and one open chain (C6H14O4), as well as an open dihydroperoxide monomer (C3H8O4), can also be formed; under a particular set of conditions of reagent and acid catalyst concentration, the cyclic trimer is the primary product. A tetrameric form has also been described, under different catalytic conditions. The synthesis of tetrameric acetone peroxide has been disputed. Under neutral conditions, the reaction is reported to produce the monomeric organic peroxide.

The most common route for nearly pure TATP is H2O2/acetone/HCl in 1:1:0.25 molar ratios, using 30% hydrogen peroxide. This product contains very little or none of DADP with some very small traces of chlorinated compounds. Product that contains large fraction of DADP can be obtained from 50% H2O2 using high amounts of conc. sulfuric acid as catalyst or alternatively with 30% H2O2 and massive amounts of HCl as a catalyst.

The product made by using hydrochloric acid is regarded as more stable than the one made using sulfuric acid. It is known that traces of sulfuric acid trapped inside the formed acetone peroxide crystals lead to instability. This is the most likely mechanism behind accidental explosions of acetone peroxide that occur during drying on heated surfaces.

Triacetone triperoxide forms in 2-propanol upon standing for long periods of time in the presence of air.

Organic peroxides in general are sensitive, dangerous explosives, and all forms of acetone peroxide are sensitive to initiation. TATP decomposes explosively; examination of the explosive decomposition of TATP at the very edge of detonation front predicts "formation of acetone and ozone as the main decomposition products and not the intuitively expected oxidation products." Very little heat is created by the explosive decomposition of TATP at the very edge of the detonation front; the foregoing computational analysis suggests that TATP decomposition is an entropic explosion. However, this hypothesis has been challenged as not conforming to actual measurements. The claim of entropic explosion has been tied to the events just behind the detonation front. The authors of the 2004 Dubnikova et al. study confirm that a final redox reaction (combustion) of ozone, oxygen and reactive species into water, various oxides and hydrocarbons takes place within about 180ps after the initial reaction - within about a micron of the detonation wave. Volume of gases at STP is 855 L/kg for TATP and 713 L/kg for DADP (measured in helium).

The tetrameric form of acetone peroxide, prepared under neutral conditions using a tin catalyst in the presence of a chelator or general inhibitor of radical chemistry, is reported to be more chemically stable, although still a very dangerous primary explosive. Its synthesis has been disputed.

Both TATP and DADP are prone to loss of mass via sublimation. DADP has lower molecular weight and higher vapor pressure. This means that DADP is more prone to sublimation than TATP.

Several methods can be used for trace analysis of TATP, including gas chromatography/mass spectrometry (GC/MS), high performance liquid chromatography/mass spectrometry (HPLC/MS), and HPLC with post-column derivitization.

Acetone peroxide is soluble in toluene, chloroform, acetone, dichloromethane and methanol. Recrystalization of primary explosives may yield large crystals that detonate spontaneously due to internal strain.

Industrial uses 
Ketone peroxides, including acetone peroxide and methyl ethyl ketone peroxide, find application as initiators for polymerization reactions, e.g., silicone or polyester resins, in the making of fiberglass-reinforced composites. For these uses, the peroxides are typically in the form of a dilute solution in an organic solvent; methyl ethyl ketone peroxide is more common for this purpose, as it is stable in storage.

Acetone peroxide is used as a flour bleaching agent to bleach and "mature" flour.

Acetone peroxides are unwanted by-products of some oxidation reactions such as those used in phenol syntheses. Due to their explosive nature, their presence in chemical processes and chemical samples creates potential hazardous situations. Accidental occurrence at illicit MDMA laboratories is possible. Numerous methods are used to reduce their appearance, including shifting pH to more alkaline, adjusting reaction temperature, or adding inhibitors of their production. For example, triacetone peroxide is the major contaminant found in diisopropyl ether as a result of photochemical oxidation in air.

Use in improvised explosive devices 

TATP has been used in bomb and suicide attacks and in improvised explosive devices, including the London bombings on 7 July 2005, where four suicide bombers killed 52 people and injured more than 700. It was one of the explosives used by the "shoe bomber" Richard Reid in his 2001 failed shoe bomb attempt and was used by the suicide bombers in the November 2015 Paris attacks, 2016 Brussels bombings, Manchester Arena bombing, June 2017 Brussels attack, Parsons Green bombing, the Surabaya bombings, and the 2019 Sri Lanka Easter bombings. Hong Kong police claim to have found  of TATP among weapons and protest materials in July 2019, when mass protests were taking place against a proposed law allowing extradition to mainland China.

TATP shockwave overpressure is 70% of that for TNT, the positive phase impulse is 55% of the TNT equivalent. TATP at 0.4 g/cm3 has about one-third of the brisance of TNT (1.2 g/cm3) measured by the Hess test.

TATP is attractive to terrorists because it is easily prepared from readily available retail ingredients, such as hair bleach and nail polish remover. It was also able to evade detection because it is one of the few high explosives that do not contain nitrogen, and could therefore pass undetected through standard explosive detection scanners, which were hitherto designed to detect nitrogenous explosives. By 2016, explosives detectors had been modified to be able to detect TATP, and new types were developed.

Legislative measures to limit the sale of hydrogen peroxide concentrated to 12% or higher have been made in the European Union.

A key disadvantage is the high susceptibility of TATP to accidental detonation, causing injuries and deaths among illegal bomb-makers, which has led to TATP being referred to as the "Mother of Satan". TATP was found in the accidental explosion that preceded the 2017 terrorist attacks in Barcelona and surrounding areas.

Large-scale TATP synthesis is often betrayed by excessive bleach-like or fruity smells. This smell can even penetrate into clothes and hair in amounts that are quite noticeable, this was reported in the 2016 Brussels bombings.

References

External links 

 ChemSub Online: Acetone peroxide – Triacetone triperoxide.

Explosive chemicals
Ketals
Organic peroxide explosives
Organic peroxides
Oxygen heterocycles
Radical initiators